Maloye Voronino is a rural locality (a village) in Vysokovskoye Rural Settlement, Ust-Kubinsky District, Vologda Oblast, Russia. The population was 6 as of 2002.

Geography 
Maloye Voronino is located 10 km northeast of Ustye (the district's administrative centre) by road. Voronino is the nearest rural locality.

References 

Rural localities in Tarnogsky District